The 2019 Mid Suffolk District Council election took place on the 2 May 2019 to elect members of Mid Suffolk District Council in England.

Summary

|-

Ward results

Bacton

Battisford & Ringshall

Blakenham

Bramford

Chilton (Stowmarket)

Claydon & Barham

Combs Ford (Stowmarket)

Debenham

Elmswell & Woolpit

Eye

Fressingfield

Gislingham

Haughley, Stowupland & Wetherden

Hoxne & Worlingworth

Mendlesham

Needham Market

Onehouse

Palgrave

Rattlesden

Rickinghall

St. Peter's (Stowmarket)

Stonham

Stow Thorney (Stowmarket)

Stradbroke & Laxfield

Thurston

Walsham-le-Willows

By-elections

Thurston

References

2019 English local elections
May 2019 events in the United Kingdom
2019
2010s in Suffolk